Duke Kimbrough was a college football player. He played as a tackle for the Sewanee Tigers, captain of the 1927 team. He was selected All-Southern.

References

American football tackles
Sewanee Tigers football players
All-Southern college football players